The Aerotrén is a people mover cable-propelled operating at Mexico City International Airport, near Mexico City, in Mexico.  The  automated people mover (APM) provides a link between Terminal 1 and  Terminal 2.

Opened in 2007, it was part of the major expansion to the airport, which is the busiest in Latin America. The link is only designed to transfer passengers connecting between flights, who must be in possession of and show a valid boarding pass.

Background 
The Aerotrén airport link at Benito Juarez International Airport connects Terminal 1 with the new Terminal 2 which had been constructed on the opposite end of the runway from the existing terminal.
The system is able to transport 540 transfer passengers per hour per direction (pphpd).

Construction
The Mexico City International Airport Automated People Mover System Project was started on August 12, 2005 when a contract was signed between the airport owners Aeropuertos y Servicios Auxiliares (ASA) and DCC Doppelmayr Cable Car. The system was completed by November 2007 at a price of €52 million.

The area around Mexico City suffers from soil settlement, and this had to be allowed for.  The elevated guideway structure has the ability to be adjusted for ground settlements. Steel adapters between the steel truss and the concrete columns allow later height adjustments to compensate for any ground movement.

Technology
A single-track, single train, Cable Liner Shuttle design was chosen. Vehicles connected to a cable, driven from under one of the stations,  that propels, accelerates, and decelerates the train.

The train is composed of four cars, each holding 26 passengers and making of a total of 104 passengers per train. An option was included for lengthening the original four car train to six cars, providing an increase from 540 pphpd up to 800 pphpd.

Operations
Only connecting passengers can use the system, who must have a valid flight boarding pass to board. Travel time is 5:45 minutes and the train pauses (dwells) for 60 seconds on each station. When the system closes for maintenance, passengers are ferried between both terminals in buses.

See also 

AirRail Link, DCC's first airport system in Birmingham, UK
LINK Train, another Cable Liner system in Toronto, Canada

References

External links 
Mexico City International Airport
DCC Doppelmayr Cable Car, manufacturer's website

Airport people mover systems
Cable Liner people movers
Mexico City International Airport
Driverless monorails
People mover systems in Mexico
Rail transportation in Mexico City
Railway lines opened in 2007
Rapid transit in Mexico